The shortfinned worm eel (Scolecenchelys australis, also known commonly as the shortfin worm eel, the worm eel, the southern worm eel, the Down's worm eel, the Iredale's worm eel, or the Scotts worm eel) is an eel in the family Ophichthidae (worm/snake eels). It was described by William John Macleay in 1881, originally under the genus Muraenichthys. It is a marine, temperate water-dwelling eel which is known from Australia, in the southwestern Pacific Ocean. It forms large colonies which inhabit burrows in soft sediments.

The shortfinned worm eel's diet consists primarily of benthic crustaceans and polychaetes.

References

Fish described in 1881
Scolecenchelys